The Beacon School, previously Nork Park School, is a mixed academy school in Banstead, Surrey. The school's values are excellence and respect. The school is a member of the GLF trust.

The 2022 ofsted rating was 'Inadequate'.

Notable former teachers
 Romesh Ranganathan - comedian (maths teacher) & head of sixth form

References

External links
 The Beacon School
 Ofsted reports

Academies in Surrey
Secondary schools in Surrey